Brett Winkelman (born January 30, 1986) is an American former professional basketball player.

From 2005 to 2009 Winkelman played for the North Dakota State Bison men's basketball team. He earned all-independent honors in 2007 and in 2008 and 2009 he was selected to the First-team All-Summit League. In 2009 Winkelman helped lead the Bison to a Summit League tournament victory and an automatic bid to the 2009 NCAA tournament. Brett Winkelman holds the NDSU all-time rebound record and sits second to teammate Ben Woodside on the NDSU all-time scoring record list. In 2009 Winkelman was named Division I Men's Basketball Academic All-American of the Year.
In July 2009, he signed with Nuova Pallacanestro Pavia in Italy.
In February 2010 he moved to Poland (Anwil Włocławek).

College statistics

See also
 2009 NCAA Men's Basketball All-Americans

References

Sources
 ESPN Stats 
 Gobison.com 

1986 births
Living people
American expatriate basketball people in Brazil
American expatriate basketball people in Italy
American expatriate basketball people in Poland
American men's basketball players
Basketball players from Minnesota
KK Włocławek players
Minas Tênis Clube basketball players
North Dakota State Bison men's basketball players
Pallacanestro Pavia players
People from Morris, Minnesota
Small forwards